Jenson Seelt (born 23 May 2003) is a Dutch professional footballer who plays as a centre-back for Jong PSV.

Career 
Seelt is a youth product of PSV, having joined the club in 2017 from NEC. He signed his first professional contract on 23 May 2019, the day of his 16th birthday. The deal linked him to PSV until 2022. He made his debut for Jong PSV (the reserve team of the club) on 11 December 2020, coming on as a substitute in a 3–2 loss to TOP Oss.

Career statistics

References

External links 
 
 

Living people
2003 births
Dutch people of Indonesian descent
Dutch footballers
Association football central defenders
NEC Nijmegen players
PSV Eindhoven players
Jong PSV players
Eerste Divisie players